Li Xiuren (1921 – 1 February 2016) was a People's Republic of China politician. He was born in Zuoquan County, Shanxi. He was Chinese Communist Party Committee Secretary of Taiyuan (1982–1983) and CPPCC Committee Chairman (1985–1993) of his home province. He was a delegate to the 6th National People's Congress (1983–1988).

References

1921 births
2016 deaths
Chinese Communist Party politicians from Shanxi
People's Republic of China politicians from Shanxi
Communist Party Committee Secretaries of Taiyuan
Delegates to the 6th National People's Congress
People from Zuoquan County
Politicians from Jinzhong